The Stein Rokkan Memorial Lecture is an annual lecture which is arranged by the Department of Comparative Politics at the University of Bergen, Norway. Since 2002, the organising of the lecture has been in cooperation with the UNI Rokkan Centre. The purpose of the lecture is to draw attention to some of the most outstanding exponents of Stein Rokkan’s fields of research; first and foremost political science, sociology and comparative politics.

Rokkan lecturers 
 1981 Erik Allardt
 1982 William J. M. Mackenzie
 1983 Peter Flora
 1984 Robert A. Dahl
 1985 Shmuel N. Eisenstadt
 1986 Reinhard Bendix
 1987 Henry Valen
 1988 Juan J. Linz
 1989 Max Kaase
 1990 Johan Galtung
 1991 Hans Daalder
 1992 Seymour Martin Lipset
 1993 Charles Tilly
 1994 Jens Alber
 1995 Peter Mair
 1996 Hans-Dieter Klingemann
 1997 Derek Urwin
 1998 Peter H. Merkl
 1999 William Miller
 2000 Stefano Bartolini
 2001 Øyvind Østerud
 2002 Theda Skocpol
 2003 Ólafur Ragnar Grímsson
 2004 Pippa Norris
 2005 Johan P. Olsen
 2007 Frances Fox Piven
 2008 Mark N. Franklin
 2009 Adam Przeworski
 2010 Bo Rothstein
 2011 Robert D. Putnam
 2012 Margaret Levi
 2013 Donatella della Porta
 2014 Herbert Kitschelt
 2015 Lee Epstein
 2016 Liesbet Hooghe and Gary Marks
 2017 Maurizio Ferrera
 2018 Kathleen Thelen
 2019 Hanspeter Kriesi
 2020 Cancelled due to Covid-19 pandemic
 2021 Lars Mjøset
2020 Sheri Berman

References 

Rokkan, Stein
University of Bergen